Manju Dinesh Kumara Wanniarachchi (born 2 December 1979) is a Sri Lankan amateur boxer. He won a gold medal at the 2010 Commonwealth Games in the bantamweight category, defeating Sean McGoldrick in the final, but was later stripped of his medal after failing a drug test. He is an old boy of Vidyartha College, Kandy.

Drugs
On 24 October 2010 National Olympic Committee of Sri Lanka announced that Wanniarachchi had failed a drug test taken during the Commonwealth Games. A urine sample provided by the boxer had contained nandrolone, a banned performance-enhancing drug. Wanniarachchi claims he failed the drug test due to the asthma medication he was taking. Wanniarachchi subsequently failed the second doping test for a banned steroid. The Amateur Boxing Association of Sri Lanka said the "B" sample of 30-year-old Wanniarachchi's urine tested positive for nandrolone, a performance-enhancing substance. Wanniarachchi announced his intention to launch an appeal.

Wanniarachchi was suspended from all boxing meets by the National Anti Doping Organization of Sri Lanka in March 2011. The Commonwealth Games Federation stripped Wanniarachchi of his gold medal on 8 May 2011 after a meeting of Federation Court in Kuala Lumpur, Malaysia. On 23 May 2011, Wanniarachchi announced he was retiring from boxing. After the lapse of the appeal period, McGoldrick was awarded the gold medal on 6 June 2011.

See also
 List of Sri Lankans by sport

References

1979 births
Boxers at the 2010 Commonwealth Games
Commonwealth Games competitors for Sri Lanka
Doping cases in boxing
Living people
Sri Lankan male boxers
Sri Lankan sportspeople in doping cases
Sportspeople from Kandy
Boxers at the 2002 Asian Games
Boxers at the 2006 Asian Games
Boxers at the 2014 Commonwealth Games
Asian Games competitors for Sri Lanka
Bantamweight boxers
20th-century Sri Lankan people
21st-century Sri Lankan people